Buizingen is a village in the municipality of Halle, Belgium. It is around 15 km southwest of the centre of Brussels.

On 15 February 2010, 19 people died and 171 were injured in a train collision in Buizingen.

Populated places in Flemish Brabant